Ghost Stories is the debut studio album by English singer-songwriter Amanda Ghost. It was released on 22 August 2000 by Warner Bros. Records. In the United States, it was released on 12 September 2000. Ghost began working on the album after she got signed to Warner Bros. by A&R executive Andrew Wickham. He offered her a record deal after listening to a CD demo of hers left with him by her manager Terry Slater.

Ghost worked with Lukas Burton and Paul Staveley O'Duffy on the album while writing all the songs. Musically, Ghost Stories is predominantly an alternative rock album influenced by electronica and trip hop. It also incorporates elements of other genres, such as  trance, breakbeat and classical music. Ghost Stories received generally positive reviews from music critics. However, it noted only a small commercial success and failed to enter the Billboard 200.

Four singles were released from the album with "Idol" and "Filthy Mind" becoming top-twenty hits on the Billboard Dance Club Songs chart. "Glory Girl" managed to chart at number 90 on the UK Singles Chart and "Silver Lining" peaked inside the Adult Pop Songs chart.

Background 
A cover of Prince's song "The Cross" was intended to be on the album. However, it was later omitted from the release.

Critical reception 

Bryan Buss from AllMusic gave the album three out of five stars. He praised Ghost's vocals for being "confessional without being self-pitying, strong while still being warm, and confrontational while simultaneously asking for compassion". He added that Ghost Stories is "a solid, confident debut that will be difficult to follow up". Greil Marcus wrote in his column "Real Life Rock Top Ten" that Ghost sounds "like she's singing from the basement of a nightclub long after whoever locked up thought it was empty - but then she changes her clothes and gets all wistful instead". Kevin Oliver, writing for PopMatters, stated "she manages to sound convincing, if a bit unoriginal," likening her music to that of Alanis Morissette, PJ Harvey, and Natalie Merchant.

Track listing 

Notes
  signifies an additional producer

Credits and personnel 
 Amanda Ghost – vocals
 Zee Asha – background vocals
 Angela Dust – background vocals
 Linda Duggan – background vocals
 Mary Pearce – background vocals
 John Fortis – bass
 Segs Jennings – bass
 Andy Gangadeen – drums
 Steve 'Pub' Jones – drums
 Ian Dench – guitar
 John Themis – guitar, background vocals
 Sacha Skarbek – keyboards
 Wil Malone – strings
 DJ Biznizz – scratches

Credits adapted from the album's liner notes.

Release history

References

External links 
 [ Ghost Stories] at AllMusic
 

Amanda Ghost albums
2000 debut albums
Warner Records albums